The Flag of Armavir is the official symbol of Armavir, Russia. It is a red rectangular cloth with the width to length ratio of 2:3. It is divided into four stripes: three horizontal stripes with equal width (two red ones and between them a blue stripe) and a blue stripe along the pole with the 1/5 of the cloth's length. The red and blue stripes on the cloth are disjointed by white outlines. A yellow sunflower with orange petals is reproduced in the middle of the blue vertical stripe. There is also a white image of caduceus heading towards the sunflower in the blue horizontal stripe.

External links
 Official symbols of Armavir 

Flags of cities in Russia
Flags introduced in 2005